Nikola "Tiske" Radović (born 10 July 1992) is a Serbian football forward.

External links
 
 Nikola Radović stats at utakmica.rs 
 

1992 births
Living people
Sportspeople from Kraljevo
Association football forwards
Serbian footballers
Serbian expatriate footballers
FK Sloga Kraljevo players
FK Jagodina players
FK BSK Borča players
FK Radnik Surdulica players
OFK Bačka players
FK Borec players
Serbian First League players
Serbian SuperLiga players
Macedonian First Football League players
Serbian expatriate sportspeople in North Macedonia
Expatriate footballers in North Macedonia